Pavel Elšík (born 23 October 1985) is a Czech football player who currently plays for FC Tescoma Zlín. He made his Gambrinus liga debut for Zlín on 28 May 2007 in a 1–1 draw at home to Olomouc.

References

Czech footballers
Czech First League players
1985 births
Living people
FC Fastav Zlín players
Association football midfielders